HDY may refer to:
 Hadiyya language, spoken in Ethiopia
 Hardy Oil and Gas, a British oil and gas company
 Hat Yai International Airport, in Thailand
 Headingley railway station, in England
 Heredity (journal)
 High-yield stocks with a high dividend yield